The Commonwealth of Independent States national football team (Sbornaya SNG po futbolu) was a transitional national team of the Football Federation of the Soviet Union in 1992. It was accepted that the team would represent the Commonwealth of Independent States. 

The CIS team was created to allow the Soviet national team further participation as it had already booked a spot in Euro 1992 through the 1990–91 qualification tournament. The only way to preserve the spot for the post-Soviet team was to take part in the competition as a unified team.

With the end of Euro 1992, the Russia national team was recognized as the only successor of the CIS team.

Situation

As the Soviet Union formally ceased to exist on 26 December 1991, so did all its organizations including the football federation. The Association of Football Federations of CIS was formed  on 11 January 1992 and was approved by FIFA two days later. Beethoven's Symphony No. 9 was adopted as its anthem. Along with the Association, national federations of its members started to form and apply for international recognition.

The CIS national football team, previously known as the USSR national football team, completed its participation in the Euro 1992 in June 1992. It was disbanded soon thereafter and all its results were transferred to the Russia national football team that played its first game in August 1992.

The CIS national football team was coached by Anatoly Byshovets. The team failed to achieve success in the 1992 European Football Championship, finishing last in the group, but achieved two notable draws with Germany and the Netherlands, before being beaten 3–0 by Scotland in what turned out to be their last match.

European Championship record

International results

Post-Soviet national federations

National federation members of the CIS association

1.  Kazakhstan were affiliated with the AFC from 1994 until 2002, when they joined UEFA.

National federations outside the CIS association

UEFA Euro 1992 squad
Head coach:  Anatoliy Byshovets

In total, the CIS squad contained seven Russians, eight Ukrainians (one born in Germany), a Georgian, a Belarusian, an Abkhazian, a Circassian, and an Ossetian.  Caps included games played for the Soviet team as well as the CIS. Some players simultaneously played for other national teams such as Kakhaber Tskhadadze (Georgia) and Akhrik Tsveiba (Ukraine).

Russia qualified for the 1994 FIFA World Cup in the United States with the bulk of the Euro 1992 CIS squad but due to the incident with the Letter of fourteeners in November 1993, Igor Shalimov, Igor Dobrovolsky, Igor Kolyvanov, Sergei Kiriakov, Vasili Kulkov, and Andrei Kanchelskis were excluded from the national team. Oleg Salenko and Andrei Ivanov, who also signed the letter, eventually withdrew their signatures. Tsveiba and Chernyshov were later called to the Russia national football team.

Some players resumed their international careers with their respective individual nations; however, many preferred to play for Russia. Although almost one third of the team were from Ukraine, only two Ukrainian players ever played for the Ukraine national football team, while another four chose to play for the Russian national team.

See also
Unified Team at the Olympics, the Olympic counterpart
Unified Team at the 1992 Summer Olympics
Unified Team at the 1992 Winter Olympics
Unified Team at the Paralympics, the Paralympic counterpart
Unified Team at the 1992 Summer Paralympics
Unified Team at the 1992 Winter Paralympics

Notes

References

External links
USSR National Football Team (in Russian)

 
1992 establishments in Russia
1992 disestablishments in Russia
Former national association football teams in Europe
Sport in the Commonwealth of Independent States
CIS
National sports teams established in 1992